Hrvoje Matković (October 14, 1923 – August 26, 2010) was a Croatian historian.

Matković was born in Šibenik. He finished gymnasium in Šibenik, and graduated history in 1947. He obtained his Ph.D. in 1971 at the University of Zagreb.

He worked in gymnasium in Ogulin (1948), then in school in Petrinja until 1954, and finally in the Croatian History Museum and Faculty of Political Science, University of Zagreb until his retirement in 1990.

Focus of Matković's research was the 20th-century history of Croatia.

Main works 

 (1972)
 (1993, 1995, 1999)
, Zagreb: Naklada P.I.P. Pavičić (1994, 2002)
 (1995)
 (1995)
 (1998)
 (1999)

Sources
 Umro povjesničar Hrvoje Matković 

1923 births
2010 deaths
20th-century Croatian historians
People from Šibenik
Faculty of Humanities and Social Sciences, University of Zagreb alumni
Academic staff of the University of Zagreb
Yugoslav historians